The Museum of Cham Sculpture is a museum located in Hải Châu District, Đà Nẵng, central Vietnam, near the Han River.

The establishment of a Cham sculpture museum in Da Nang was first proposed in 1902 by the Department of Archaeology of EFEO. Henri Parmentier, a prominent archaeologist of the department, made great contributions to the campaign for its construction.  Reportedly founded in 1915 as the Musée Henri Parmentier, its first building opened in 1919 and was designed by two French architects, M. Deleval and M. Auclair, who were inspired by Parmentier to use some traditional Cham elements in the composition.  Prior to the establishment of the museum, the site was known as the "garden of sculptures" and many Cham sculptures that had been collected in Da Nang, Quảng Nam and elsewhere had been brought there over the preceding twenty years.

The museum has been expanded twice. The first expansion was in the mid-1930s, with two new galleries providing display space for the objects added in the 1920s and 1930s. Henri Parmentier directed the display based on the areas where sculptures were found. The 1000 meter square of floor space was arranged for the collections of Mỹ Sơn, Trà Kiệu, Đồng Dương, Tháp Mẫm, Quang Tri, Quảng Ngãi, Bình Định and Kon Tum.  In 2002, the Museum was again expanded with the two-story building providing an additional 1000 square meters.  The new building provides not only space for display, but also for storage, a library, a restoration workshop and offices for staff.

Before 2007, the Museum was managed by Da Nang Museums, an administrative organ in charge of the city's museums and heritage.  In 2008 it became affiliated with the city Department of Culture, Sport and Tourism.

The museum houses the world's largest collection of Cham sculpture and is a popular tourist destination.

Sculptures at the Museum

See also
Art of Champa

Literature

External links 

 Vietnam National Administration of Tourism | Museum of Cham Sculpture
 Photo gallery of the museum

Museums in Vietnam
Cham
Buildings and structures in Da Nang
French colonial architecture in Vietnam
Archaeological museums
Tourist attractions in Da Nang